Irisaĝrig (also Urusagrig, Iri-Saĝrig, and Al-Šarrākī) was an ancient Near East city in Iraq whose location is not known with certainty but is currently thought to be at the site of Tell al-Wilayah, on the ancient Mama-šarrat canal off the Tigris river, near the ancient site of Kesh, Tulul al-Baqarat. The city was occupied during the Early Dynastic, Akkadian, Ur III, and early Old Babylonian periods. While cuneiform tablets from the city had appeared from time to time, the flood of artifacts entering the private market from looting which followed the 2003 war in Iraq included a large number from Irisaĝrig. This spurred interest by archaeologist in finding the site. The city became of popular interest because of the Hobby Lobby smuggling scandal. While there were a number of significant temples in the city, the titular deity is not known.

Location

In 1992, Douglas Frayne proposed the site of Umm al-Hafriyyat as the location based a) on it being 4 rowing days upstream from Umma on the Iturungal Canal off the Euphrates river, suggested by an early itinerary, b) on it being the largest mound north of Adab with known Early Dynastic and Sargonic remains and c) on reports of the quality of tablet making clay at the site. After more consideration, in 2001, Piotr Steinkeller judged that the site had to lie off the Tigris river and not the Euphrates and must lie north of Adab. He suggested several unnamed mounds as possible locations for Irisaĝrig.

More Ur III texts became available on boat journeys between Irisaĝrig, Nippur, and Umma, combined with better information of ancient watercourse in there are, allowed refinement on the distances involved. Additionally, satellite photographs of looting activity were correlated with the appearance of tablets from the site on the private market. Surface surveys also were checked to match the periods when the city was known to be occupied. The result was a proposal that Irisaĝrig was located at one of two sites 1) Site #1032 - 80 kilometers upstream of Umma, and 2) Site #1056 - 76 kilometers upstream of Umma on the Adams survey.

Further work negated an assumption of earlier researchers that Irisaĝrig was near to Nippur, actually being somewhat further away. Excavation at Tulul al-Baqarat showed it to be the site of Kesh. Irisaĝrig and Kesh were known from inscriptions to be very near to each other with the later acting as a cult site under the control of the former. Tulul al-Baqarat is about 6 kilometers from Tell al-Wilayah. They are also connected by a canal. Irisaĝrig  is known to have been quite large and the proposed Tell al-Wilayah site is a sizable 64 hectares. Surface surveys and brief excavations by Iraqi archaeologists at the site have also shown it to have been occupied at the proper times. This all has led to the current proposal that Tell al-Wilayah is Irisaĝrig. This is not without some scholarly dissent. Steinkeller has stated that Tell al-Wilayah is definitely not Irisaĝrigis but may actually be ancient Anzagar.

Archaeology
While Irisaĝrig has not yet been excavated (or definitely located) thousands of cuneiform tablets from there are available as a result of looting. The majority are from the Ur III period. The large number of tablets allows analysis such as the determination of the calendar system in use in Irisaĝrig, one only found in Sargonic tablets from Tell al-Willayah. A unique rationing system was also in place in the city. The tablets also document numerous visits by the Ur III rulers for reasons as yet unclear but possibly related to the presence of three temples to deified rulers of that dynasty in Irisaĝrig.

History
The city of Irisaĝrig is known through a number of cuneiform inscriptions dating back into the Early Dynastic IIIb period. It was also occupied during the Sargonic period. Two year names of Akkadian Empire rulers mention Urusagrig ie "Year in which Il the temple official of Urusagrig was seized" and "Year in which the ensi of Nippur allied? with Urusagrig ...".From a seal the name of one governor under the Akkadian Empire ruler Naram-Sin is known, Šaratigubišin (prince and son of Naram-Sin):

dNa-ra-am-dSuen / LUGAL / ki-ib-ra-tim / ar-ba-im -
NaramSuen, king of the Four Quarters of the World
Sar-a-ti-gu-bi-si-in   / ENSI2   / Uru-sag-rig7ki   / DUMU-su - 
Šaratigubišin, governor of Urusagrig, his son

During the time of the Ur III empire it was a major provincial capital and transportation hub. It was also closely linked in this period with the unlocated ancient city of Garšana and known to be a transshipment point for goods to Der. Thanks to the numerous records produced by that empire much is known about the city, its daily life, and its interactions, especially trade related, with other parts of the empire.

An example of daily life would be the woman Ninsaga, daughter of governor under Ur rulers from Amar-Sin (year 7) through Shu-Sin up to Ibbi-Sîn (year 9) Ur-mes, who managed her large estate in the city. The estate included hundreds of male and female slaves. Two other governors are known to have followed Ur-mes, Ilalum and Dadani. In a text found at nearby Kesh another governor, la-ra-ra dumu is-[gar], is mentioned.

Another example would be the merchant Turam-ili, known from an archive of tablets from the private market which have now been assigned to Irisaĝrig. And a scribe, Ilum-asu, who along with his father Bibi and brothers Mašum and Ašgi-ibra handled the administration of rations for a number of workers in Irisaĝrig.

With the Ur empire in decline the city of Malgium conquered Irisaĝrig roughly after year 10 of Ibbi-Sin (c. 2028–2004 BC), the last ruler of the Ur III empire. Tablets showed that six rulers of Malium ruled over Irisaĝrig. They left the existing Ur III administrative system in place while changing to the calendar of Malgium.

See also
Cities of the ancient Near East

References

Further reading

 
 Kleinerman, Alexandra. "The Barbers of Iri-Saĝrig". In: From the 21st Century BC to the 21st Century AD: Proceedings of the International Conference on Neo-Sumerian Studies Held in Madrid, 22–24 July 2010. Edited by Steven J. Garfinkle and Manuel Molina, University Park, USA: Penn State University Press, pp. 89–102, 2021
 
 Martos, Manuel Molina. "Textos cuneiformes sumerios de la antigua ciudad de Irisaĝrig". In: Ex Baetica Romam: homenaje a José Remesal Rodríguez. Universitat de Barcelona, 2020.
 Owen, David I. “New Iri-Saĝrig Ration Distribution and Related Texts.” Over the Mountains and Far Away: Studies in Near Eastern History and Archaeology Presented to Mirjo Salvini on the Occasion of His 80th Birthday, edited by Pavel S. Avetisyan et al., Archaeopress, 2019, pp. 371–80. JSTOR, https://doi.org/10.2307/j.ctvndv9f0.47.

External links
Stolen Sumerian Tablets Come from the Lost City of Irisagrig - LiveScience - Owen Jarus - 30 April 2018

Archaeological sites in Iraq